Daniel Doom (born 28 November 1934) is a Belgian former professional racing cyclist. He won the E3 Harelbeke in 1960.

References

External links

1934 births
Living people
Belgian male cyclists
Cyclists from West Flanders
People from Kortemark